Insomniac or The Insomniac may refer to:

 A person who has insomnia

Music 
 Insomniac (Green Day album), 1995
 Insomniac (Enrique Iglesias album), 2007
 "Insomniac" (song), a 1994 song by Echobelly
 "Insomniac", a song by Billy Pilgrim
 Insomniac, a record label founded by Poets of the Fall
 Insomniac (promoter), an American music journalism website and tour promoter focusing primarily on electronic music events

Other media 
 The Insomniac (2013 film), an American film directed by Monty Miranda
 Insomniac Games, an American video game developer
 Insomniac Press, a Canadian independent book publisher
 Insomniac with Dave Attell, a 2001–04 television series

See also
 The Insomniax, an American songwriting/production duo
 Insomnia (disambiguation)